Gustaf Nyblæus (23 March 1816, in Stockholm – 6 October 1902) was a Swedish military man, gymnast and member of the Riksdag. As a politician he worked to make gymnastics a bigger part of school in Sweden.

References

Swedish politicians
1816 births
1902 deaths